Major League Baseball (MLB) has a luxury tax called the "Competitive Balance Tax" (CBT). In place of a salary cap, the competitive balance tax regulates the total sum of money a given team can spend on their roster. Salary caps are common across professional sports leagues in the United States. Without these measures, teams would not be restricted on the amount of money spent on players' salaries. Therefore, teams with greater funding or revenue would possess a competitive advantage in their ability to attract top talent via higher salaries. 

The MLB implemented the competitive balance tax in 1997 to reduce anti-competitive behavior in the league. The Commissioner's Office sets the competitive balance tax threshold each year. Unlike other professional sports leagues, the MLB allows teams to go over the threshold, however, doing so results in the team being charged a tax on all overages. Per the MLB's 2017-2021 Collective Bargaining Agreement, the overage premium for exceeding the competitive balance tax is tiered as follows: 

The luxury tax increases based on the number of consecutive seasons above the CBT threshold. If a club "dips below the luxury tax threshold for a season, the penalty level is reset." In addition to the luxury tax, "clubs that exceed the threshold by $20 million to $40 million are also subject to a 12 percent surtax. Meanwhile, those who exceed it by more than $40 million are taxed at a 42.5 percent rate the first time and a 45 percent rate if they exceed it by more than $40 million again the following year(s)."

The primary goal of the CBT is to encourage a competitive balance amongst teams while allowing big spending on players. The CBT threshold/tax rates have undergone several changes since 1997.

History of the Major League Baseball luxury tax

1997–1999 
The 1994 Major League Baseball season was cut short due to the Major League Baseball strike. A primary source of conflict leading up to the strike was the tremendous power club owners had over the salaries of players on their respective teams. Small market teams felt handcuffed by their relatively anemic budgets while players from larger market teams were unwilling to accept the substantial pay cuts that a salary cap would likely have imposed. This resulted in a compromise in the Collective Bargaining Agreement of 1996, which imposed Major League Baseball's first luxury tax.

The first agreement stated that the top five salary teams in each year would pay a 34% fine on each dollar a team spent beyond halfway between the salaries of the fifth and sixth teams. For example, if the fifth-highest salary team had a payroll of $100 million and the sixth-highest salary team had a payroll of $98 million, the top five teams would pay 34% on each dollar they spent over $99 million. Below is the amount each team paid from 1997 to 1999, when this system was in place.

2002–present 
The system today is based on the 2002 collective bargaining agreement. The MLB luxury tax was eliminated from 2000 to 2002, and the MLB brought it back with a new change to the system. Instead of putting a level between the 5th and 6th teams, they decided to set a threshold that a team could not pass without a fee. This allowed teams to control their own fate more, as they were not being compared to other teams. This meant they would get punished only if they passed a certain level, rather than if they were in the top 5 in the year for salary. The 2002 CBA set the threshold for the 2003–2006 seasons, was updated for the 2007–2012 seasons in the 2006 CBA and was updated again for the 2013–2016 seasons in the 2012 CBA. The 2016 CBA has set the threshold for the 2017–2021 seasons. The tax threshold for the 2003–2021 seasons are listed in the table below.

Just as with the old system, teams would have to pay a percentage of every dollar their payroll exceeded the set threshold. Under the 2002 and 2006 CBAs, the agreement brought about a progressive taxation system. They agreed that first-time offenders would pay a fee of 17.5% of excess payrolls (later increased to 22.5%), second-time offenders would pay 30%, and third-time offenders would pay 40%. In the 2012 CBA, after seeing teams go over more than three times, the agreement added a 50% taxation level when teams went over the limit four or more times. Under the 2016 CBA, first-time offenders would pay a fee of 20% on the dollar, second-time offenders would pay a 30% on the dollar, and third or subsequent time offenders would have to pay 50% on the dollar (These offenses must be in consecutive years for these percentages. If a team falls below the threshold one year the penalty resets the next year to the "first offense").

From 2003 to 2021, in every year at least one team has surpassed the tax threshold; only ten different teams have passed the threshold in that period. Below is a breakdown of how much each team has paid since the inception of the new competitive balance tax in 2003, through the 2021 season.

Allocation of taxes paid 
On December 2 in each contract year, the Commissioner's Office notifies every team that exceeded the tax threshold that they must pay their tax by January 21 of the following calendar year. The Commissioner's Office then redistributes this money in a standard manner. The first $13 million will be used to defray clubs' funding obligations under the MLB Players Benefits Agreements. Of the remaining sum, 50% of the remaining proceeds collected for each Contract Year, with accrued interest, will be used to fund player compensation as described in the MLB Players Benefits Plan Agreements and the other 50% shall be distributed to clubs that did not exceed the Base Tax Threshold in that Contract Year.

Other MLB revenue sharing policies 
Major League Baseball also has policies improving the competitive balance off of the field. As a part of their base plan of revenue sharing, each team sends in 31% of their local net revenues into a putative pool. Local net revenue is described as gross revenue from ticket sales, concessions, etc. minus central revenue from television and radio deals minus actual stadium expenses. This pool will then be distributed equally to all 30 teams, regardless of how much each paid. Teams that paid more than they were distributed are labeled as payers, and teams that received more than they contributed are labeled as payees. This system is a direct way for poorer teams to get more money from the richer teams to level the competitive balance.

Reaction across the league 
The effectiveness of this tax is still uncertain among MLB owners, as they take different approaches to the situation. Because of increasing tax levels when the cap is exceeded in consecutive years, there is an incentive to reset to the year one tax rate. That increasing incremental penalty can affect a team's decision regarding whether to retain a key player when they are already over the threshold, as they may be averse to paying a substantial fee. Some owners have stated that they will spend whatever they want as long as it is beneficial to the team, whereas others admit that it can handicap the team a lot in the long run.

Efficacy 
The efficacy can be viewed in two different ways. As the years have gone on, the tax payments have increased into substantial amounts. According to USA Today Sports, more teams have come close to or surpassed the tax threshold in recent years as salaries have risen, especially in the past few seasons, despite owners wanting to stay below the tax threshold. However, in 2015, teams in the middle of the payroll pack won playoff games, as well as the World Series, as none of the teams that went over the tax threshold won a playoff series. This contrasts strongly with the dominance of the Atlanta Braves and New York Yankees dynasties in the 1990s. Despite the success in 2015, the efficacy could be an outlier. According to FiveThirtyEight's Noah Davis and Michael Lopez, despite the new system, cash buys more wins now than they did in the past. They also state that some teams win less when they spend more, proving there is no strong correlation between payroll and performance.

Theoretical arguments for how the tax system works 
The commissioner's office has a stated desire for a competitive balance in professional sports. It could be problematic for the same handful of teams to be successful every year because perennially  failing teams could go bankrupt (making the league's total market smaller). 
A 2013 study in the Academy of Business Research Journal showed a positive relationship between all 30 MLB teams' winning percentage, team salaries, operating income, operating profit margin, gross profit, and team revenue from 2002-2010. This study appears to show that there is no difference in average profits after a payroll increase, but there is a significant increase in winning percentage associated with an increase in payroll.  Based on these assumptions, teams may spend as they have to help their teams win, and general managers will prioritize wins over profits, allowing teams with more favorable revenue situations to spend more, and win more, leading to an ever-expanding imbalance.

The first obvious impact of Major League Baseball's luxury tax is that it artificially deflates player salaries relative to the open market, which may increase owner profits.   This approach is justified by a 2009 working paper from the University of Zurich. The paper develops a game-theory model that addresses the effects of a luxury tax on competitive balance, team profits, and social welfare.  
This model has half the teams above a certain tax threshold, and the other half below. The teams above pay taxable balances from their "excess" revenue, and those funds are redistributed to the teams below. This research argues that the smaller-revenue teams could sustain larger salaries than before the tax was implemented, but that larger-revenue teams would not be affected substantially by the system. In other words, the paper argues that total player salaries across the league are counter-intuitively increased by the system.  The authors argue that the luxury tax competitive balance system helps the players, improves social welfare, and helps the fans of Major League Baseball.  

The MLB Players Association strongly disputes this conclusion. The Players have  attempted to push back against the luxury tax system during each periodic renegotiation of their collective bargaining agreement since the tax was first implemented.  In the Players' view, the luxury tax system is fundamentally designed to limit the earnings of players by functioning as a stealth salary cap.  

Because MLB finances are kept secret from the public and from the Player's Association, it is impossible for outside observers at this time to confidently assess the full impact of the tax system on players, teams, owners, or fans.

References 

Major League Baseball rules